Pelka is a surname. People with the surname include:

 Adrian Pelka (born 1981), German footballer
 Daniel Pelka (2007–2012), child abuse victim
 Hartmut Pelka (1957–2014), German footballer
 Kazia Pelka (born 1962), English actress
 Valentine Pelka (born 1956), English actor

See also